Belva Davis (born Belvagene Melton; October 13, 1932) is an American television and radio journalist. She is the first African-American woman to become a television reporter on the U.S. West Coast. She has won eight Emmy Awards and been recognized by the American Women in Radio and Television and National Association of Black Journalists.

After growing up in Oakland, California, Davis began writing freelance articles for magazines in 1957. Within a few years, she began reporting on radio and television. As a reporter, Davis covered many important events of the day, including issues of race, gender, and politics. She became an anchorwoman and hosted her own talk show, before retiring in 2012.

Early life
Belvagene Melton was born on October 13, 1932, to John and Florence Melton in Monroe, Louisiana. She is the oldest of four children. Her mother was 14 years old at Belva's birth, and Belva spent her early years living with various relatives. When she was eight years old, Belva and her family, including aunts and cousins, moved to a two-bedroom apartment in the West Oakland neighborhood of Oakland, California. Eleven people lived in the apartment. Davis later said about her youth, "I learned to survive. And, as I moved from place to place, I learned to adapt. When I got older, I just figured I could become whatever it was that I needed to become."

By the late 1940s, her parents were able to afford a house in Berkeley, California. Davis graduated from Berkeley High School in 1951, becoming the first member of her family to graduate from high school. She applied and got accepted into San Francisco State University but couldn't afford to attend college. She went to work as a typist at the Oakland Naval Supply Depot, earning $2,000 a year.

Journalism career
Davis accepted a freelance assignment in 1957 for Jet, a magazine focusing on African American issues, and became a stringer for the publication. She received $5 per piece with no byline. Over the next few years, she began writing for other African American publications, including the Sun Reporter and Bay Area Independent. Davis edited the Sun Reporter from 1961 through 1968.

In 1961, Davis became an on-air interviewer for KSAN, a San Francisco AM radio station broadcasting a rhythm and blues music format, targeting black listeners in the Bay Area. She made her television debut in 1963 for KTVU, an Oakland-based television station, covering an African American beauty pageant. She worked as a disc jockey for KDIA, a soul-gospel radio station (also based in Oakland) when the 1964 Republican National Convention, located at the Cow Palace in nearby Daly City, California, inspired her to become a reporter. According to Davis' account, while she was covering the convention with Louis Freeman, the two were chased out of the Cow Palace by convention attendees throwing food at them and yelling racial slurs. It would not be the last time she encountered racism on the job: In 1967 she covered a march during the Civil Rights Movement in Forsyth County, Georgia, and attempted to interview a white woman who spat in her face.

Davis worked for KNEW, an AM radio station located in Oakland, as an announcer in 1966. She became the first female African American television journalist on the West Coast when she was hired by KPIX-TV, the CBS affiliate based in San Francisco, in 1966. She spent the next three decades working for KPIX, becoming an anchorwoman in 1970, and a few years later moved to the local NBC affiliate, KRON-TV. Stories she covered include the Berkeley riots of the Free Speech Movement, the Black Panthers, the mass suicide-murder at Jonestown, the Moscone–Milk assassinations, the AIDS and crack epidemics, and the 1998 United States embassy bombing in Tanzania.

Davis was highly regarded for her coverage of politics and issues of race and gender, as well as her calm demeanor. Rita Williams, a reporter for KTVU, said "Belva knew instinctively how to keep everyone in check. Amid all these prima donnas, she had so much class, so much presence, so much intuition. Belva has always been the grande dame."

Her autobiography, entitled Never in My Wildest Dreams: A Black Woman's Life in Journalism, was published in 2010.  In the foreword he contributed for her 2010 autobiography, Bill Cosby wrote she also had symbolic value to the African American television audience, as "someone who sustained us, who made us proud." He wrote that "We looked forward to seeing her prove the stereotypical ugliness of those days to be wrong."

Davis hosted "This Week in Northern California" on PBS member station KQED, starting in the 1990s.  She retired in November 2012. Her final broadcast included a taped interview with Maya Angelou, a personal friend, as she wanted the theme of her final show to be friendship.

Personal
Belva married Frank Davis on January 1, 1952. The couple had two children, and a granddaughter. Davis met her second husband, Bill Moore, in 1967 while working at KPIX-TV. Davis and Moore used to live in the San Francisco neighborhood of Presidio Heights, but now live in Petaluma, California. Belva Davis, a private person, for most of her journalistic life separated her personal life from her professional life.  In 1975, Davis allowed an African American woman and American Women in Radio and TV member, Kathleen H. Arnold (today anthropologist Kathleen Rand Reed), to produce Belva Davis – This is Your Life.  Davis mentored Reed for decades.

Davis serves on the boards of Museum of the African Diaspora, the Institute on Aging, and the Fine Arts Museums of San Francisco. Davis raised $5 million for the Museum of the African Diaspora in one year.

Honors
Davis won eight Emmy Awards from the San Francisco / Northern California chapter. She is an honorary member of Alpha Kappa Alpha. She has received lifetime achievement awards from the American Women in Radio and Television and National Association of Black Journalists.

Bibliography

References

External links

Living people
1932 births
People from Monroe, Louisiana
African-American women journalists
African-American journalists
American broadcast news analysts
American radio reporters and correspondents
Writers from the San Francisco Bay Area
Mass media in the San Francisco Bay Area
Emmy Award winners
Berkeley High School (Berkeley, California) alumni
Television personalities from San Francisco
African-American history in the San Francisco Bay Area
American autobiographers
Writers from Oakland, California
Women autobiographers
21st-century American non-fiction writers
21st-century American women writers
Journalists from California
American women television journalists
American women radio journalists
21st-century African-American women writers
21st-century African-American writers
20th-century African-American people
20th-century African-American women